Isahaya-higashi-kōkō Station (諫早東高校駅, Isahaya-higashi-kōkō-eki) is a train station located in Moriyama-machi, Isahaya, Nagasaki Prefecture. The station is serviced by Shimabara Railway and is a part of the Shimabara Railway Line.

Lines 
The train station is serving for the Shimabara Railway Line with the local trains stop at the station.

History 
The station, formerly known as Isahaya-higashi-kōkōmae Station, was renamed to what it is now on 1 October 2019.

Adjacent stations

See also 
 List of railway stations in Japan

References

External links 
 

Railway stations in Japan opened in 1984
Railway stations in Nagasaki Prefecture
Stations of Shimabara Railway